Stimson line is one of the symptoms of measles, characterized by transverse line of inflammation along the eyelid margin.

Eponym
It is named after Philip Moen Stimson (1888–1971), an American pediatrician who characterized it in 1926.

References

Medical signs
Measles